Hamilton Cliff is an imposing rock cliff that rises more than  and forms the northeastern extremity of the Ford Massif, in the Thiel Mountains of Antarctica. The name was proposed by Peter Bermel and Arthur B. Ford, co-leaders of the United States Geological Survey (USGS) Thiel Mountains party which surveyed these mountains in 1960–61, and the cliff was named for Warren B. Hamilton, USGS representative in charge of geologic studies in the McMurdo Sound dry valley area, 1958–59.

References

Cliffs of Ellsworth Land